Millhouse may refer to:

People
 Eric Millhouse (1891–1950), South Australian lawyer and advocate for returned servicemen
 Robin Millhouse (1929–2017), South Australian politician
 Milhouse Van Houten, a fictional character from The Simpsons

Places
 Millhouse Green, a village in Barnsley, England
 Millhouse, Argyll, a village in Argyll and Bute, Scotland
 Millhouse, Cumbria, a village in England
 Millhouses, a suburb of the City of Sheffield, England
 Millhouses, Barnsley, England

Others
 Millhouse (film), a 1971 documentary film on Richard Milhous Nixon's career from 1946 to 1968
 Millhouse LLC, the asset management company of Roman Abramovich

See also 
 Milhous (disambiguation)
Mulhouse